La Soif de l'or (Thirst for gold) is a 1993 French comedy film directed by Gérard Oury. It features Tsilla Chelton, Christian Clavier and Catherine Jacob.

Plot

Cast 
 Tsilla Chelton as Mémé Zézette
 Christian Clavier as Urbain Donnadieu
 Catherine Jacob as Fleurette
 Philippe Khorsand as Jacques
 Marine Delterme as Laurence
 Pascal Greggory as Jean-Louis Auger
 Bernard Haller as Le comte Muller
 Jacky Nercessian as Le représentant

References

External links 

1993 films
French comedy films
1993 comedy films
Films scored by Vladimir Cosma
1990s French films